Jiaomei railway station is a railway station located in Longhai City, Zhangzhou, Fujian Province, China, on the Xiamen–Shenzhen railway operated by the Nanchang Railway Bureau, China Railway Corporation.

Railway stations in Fujian